The Woman with the Fan is a 1921 British silent drama film directed by René Plaissetty and starring Mary Massart, Alec Fraser and Paulette del Baye. It is an adaptation of the 1904 novel of the same title by Robert Hichens.

Cast
 Mary Massart as Lady Violet / Pimpernel Schley 
 Alec Fraser as Lord Fitz Holmes 
 Paulette del Baye as Mrs. Wolfstein 
 Cyril Percival as Rupert Carey 
 Harold Deacon as Robin Pearce 
 George Calliga as Leo Ullford

References

Bibliography
 Goble, Alan. The Complete Index to Literary Sources in Film. Walter de Gruyter, 1999.

External links

1921 films
1921 drama films
British drama films
British silent feature films
Stoll Pictures films
Films directed by René Plaissetty
British black-and-white films
Films set in London
Films based on British novels
1920s English-language films
1920s British films
Silent drama films